The 2020 United States Senate election in Arkansas was held on November 3, 2020, to elect a member of the United States Senate to represent the State of Arkansas, concurrently with the 2020 U.S. presidential election, as well as other elections to the United States Senate, elections to the United States House of Representatives and various state and local elections. 

Incumbent Republican senator Tom Cotton won reelection to a second term, defeating Libertarian challenger Ricky Dale Harrington Jr. Though Cotton outperformed President Donald Trump in the concurrent presidential election by 4.1%, the election saw an undervote of 26,000 compared to the presidential election. Harrington's 33.5% finish was the best ever for a Libertarian candidate in a U.S. Senate election by vote percentage, surpassing Joe Miller's vote share in the 2016 Alaska race, and also by total number of votes, surpassing Michael Cloud's total in the 2002 Massachusetts race. It was also the highest vote percentage ever won by a Libertarian candidate in any U.S. statewide race, surpassing John Monds's vote share in the 2008 Georgia Public Service Commission race. Per exit polls, this largely appears to be due to many Democrats deciding to pick Harrington as there was no Democratic candidate on the ballot (82% of Democratic voters backed Harrington). Harrington won three counties, all of which were also won by Democratic presidential nominee Joe Biden.

Republican nominee 
In 2018, Tom Cotton, the incumbent U.S. senator, announced that he would run for re-election in 2020. Without any opposing candidates, there was not a contested primary, so Cotton automatically won the Republican nomination.

Libertarian nominee
Ricky Dale Harrington Jr., Christian missionary and prison chaplain, announced that he would seek the Libertarian nomination. He subsequently became the Libertarian nominee.

Withdrawn candidates

Democratic Party
Josh Mahony was the only candidate to file for the Democratic primary; however, he withdrew his candidacy due to a "family health concern" on November 12, 2019. Because Mahony dropped out after the filing deadline, the Democratic Party of Arkansas could only nominate a replacement if the candidate died, became seriously ill, left the state, or filed for another office. As a result, the Democratic Party of Arkansas was not able to fill the vacancy. A memo from the Cotton campaign to supporters detailed a strategy of sitting on opposition research regarding Mahony's employment history until after the filing deadline had passed.

Withdrawn
Josh Mahony, nonprofit executive, former chair of the Fayetteville Airport Commission, and nominee for Arkansas's 3rd congressional district in 2018

Declined 
Wesley Clark, retired General, former Supreme Allied Commander of NATO, and 2004 Democratic presidential candidate

Independents

Withdrawn
Dan Whitfield, progressive activist. On June 25, 2020, Whitfield's petition to run was denied for failing to gain enough signatures, an effort that was complicated by the COVID-19 pandemic. Whitfield filed an appeal with the United States Court of Appeals for the Eighth Circuit in an attempt to overturn this ruling. He officially suspended his campaign on October 1.

General election

In public comments, Harrington spoke about excessive partisanship in the election process itself and in Senate operations, such as the contentious nomination of Amy Coney Barrett to the Supreme Court. Cotton declined to attend a debate hosted by Arkansas PBS, leaving Harrington as the sole participant. Harrington spent the debate responding to questions put to him by a panel of journalists.

Predictions

Endorsements

Polling

Graphical summary

Polls

Results
Harrington won three counties, becoming the first ever Libertarian senate candidate to win multiple counties.

Counties that flipped from Democratic to Republican
Chicot (largest municipality: Dermott)
Clark (largest municipality: Arkadelphia)
Crittenden (largest municipality: West Memphis)
Desha (largest municipality: Dumas)
Lee (largest municipality: Marianna)
Mississippi (largest municipality: Blytheville)
Monroe (largest municipality: Brinkley)
Ouachita (largest municipality: Camden)
St. Francis (largest municipality: Forrest City)
Woodruff (largest municipality: Augusta)

Counties that flipped from Democratic to Libertarian
Jefferson (largest municipality: Pine Bluff)
Phillips (largest municipality: Helena–West Helena)
Pulaski (largest municipality: Little Rock)

Notes

Partisan clients

See also
 2020 Arkansas elections

References

External links
 
 
  (State affiliate of the U.S. League of Women Voters)
 

Official campaign websites
 Tom Cotton (R) for Senate
 Ricky Dale Harrington Jr. (L) for Senate (archived)

2020
Arkansas
United States Senate